Sir Geoffrey Wilkinson FRS (14 July 1921 – 26 September 1996) was a Nobel laureate English chemist who pioneered inorganic chemistry and homogeneous transition metal catalysis.

Education and early life
Wilkinson was born at Springside, Todmorden, in the West Riding of Yorkshire. His father, Henry Wilkinson, was a master house painter and decorator; his mother, Ruth, worked in a local cotton mill. One of his uncles, an organist and choirmaster, had married into a family that owned a small chemical company making Epsom and Glauber's salts for the pharmaceutical industry; this is where he first developed an interest in chemistry.

He was educated at the local council primary school and, after winning a County Scholarship in 1932, went to Todmorden Grammar School. His physics teacher there, Luke Sutcliffe, had also taught Sir John Cockcroft, who received a Nobel Prize for "splitting the atom". In 1939 he obtained a Royal Scholarship for study at Imperial College London, from where he graduated in 1941, with his PhD awarded in 1946 entitled "Some physico-chemical observations of hydrolysis in the homogeneous vapour phase".

Career and research
In 1942 Professor Friedrich Paneth was recruiting young chemists for the nuclear energy project. Wilkinson joined and was sent out to Canada, where he stayed in Montreal and later Chalk River Laboratories until he could leave in 1946. For the next four years he worked with Professor Glenn T. Seaborg at University of California, Berkeley, mostly on nuclear taxonomy. He then became a research associate at the Massachusetts Institute of Technology and began to return to his first interest as a student – transition metal complexes of ligands such as carbon monoxide and olefins.

He was at Harvard University from September 1951 until he returned to England in December 1955, with a sabbatical break of nine months in Copenhagen. At Harvard, he still did some nuclear work on excitation functions for protons in cobalt, but had already begun to work on olefin complexes.

In June 1955 he was appointed to the chair of Inorganic Chemistry at Imperial College London, and from then on worked almost entirely on the complexes of transition metals.

Wilkinson is well known for his popularisation of the use of Wilkinson's catalyst RhCl(PPh3)3 in catalytic hydrogenation, and for the discovery of the structure of ferrocene. Wilkinson's catalyst is used industrially in the hydrogenation of alkenes to alkanes.

He supervised PhD students and postdoctoral researchers including John A. Osborn, Alan Davison and Malcolm Green.

Awards and honours
Wilkinson received many awards, including the Nobel Prize for Chemistry in 1973 for his work on "organometallic compounds" (with Ernst Otto Fischer). He is also well known for writing, with his former doctoral student F. Albert Cotton, "Advanced Inorganic Chemistry", often referred to simply as "Cotton and Wilkinson", one of the standard inorganic chemistry textbooks.

He was elected a Fellow of the Royal Society (FRS) in 1965. In 1980 he was awarded an honorary doctorate of science from the University of Bath. Imperial College London named a new hall of residence after him, which opened in October 2009. Wilkinson Hall is named in his honour.

Personal life
Wilkinson was married to Lise Schou, a Danish plant physiologist whom he had met at Berkeley. They had two daughters, Anne and Pernille.

References

External links 
 

1921 births
1996 deaths
Alumni of Imperial College London
Academics of Imperial College London
English chemists
British Nobel laureates
Inorganic chemists
Knights Bachelor
Nobel laureates in Chemistry
People from Todmorden
Royal Medal winners
Fellows of the Royal Society
Foreign associates of the National Academy of Sciences
English Nobel laureates